Bancharampur is an upazila (administrative region similar to a county) in the Brahmanbaria District in the Division of Chittagong, Bangladesh.

Geography

Demographics
According to the 2010 Bangladesh census, Bancharampur had a population of 358,371 in 43,987 households. 120,882 were 18 years of age and above. Bancharampur had an average literacy rate of 50.9% for citizens aged 7 and older at the time, compared to the national average of 32.4%

Administration
Bancharampur Upazila is divided into 13 union parishads: Ayabpur, Bancharampur, Dariadaulat, Darikandi, Fardabad, Manikpur, Pahariyakandi, Rupasdi, Saifullyakandi, Salimabad, Sonarampur, Tezkhali, and Ujanchar. The union parishads are subdivided into 69 mauzas and 121 villages.

Villages

See also
Upazilas of Bangladesh
Districts of Bangladesh
Divisions of Bangladesh

References

External links

Welcome to Bancharampur Upazila

Upazilas of Brahmanbaria District